KSTI is a Country broadcast radio station licensed to Port Angeles, Washington, serving Port Angeles and Sequim in Washington.  KSTI is owned and operated by Radio Pacific, Inc.

References

External links
 The Strait 102 Online
 The Strait 102.1 Facebook
 

2014 establishments in Washington (state)
Country radio stations in the United States
Radio stations established in 2014
STI